Ihor Hryhorovych Petrov (born 30 January 1964) is a Ukrainian professional football manager and former player.

Playing career
In 1983 Petrov took part in the Summer Spartakiad of the Peoples of the USSR in the team of Ukrainian SSR.

Managing career
In 2012, he received the UEFA Pro Licence.

In 2015 Petrov became a president of the Donetsk People's Republic Football Union.

Career statistics

Club

Honours
 Soviet Cup winner: 1983
 Soviet Cup finalist: 1986
 Ukrainian Cup winner: 1995

References

External links
 
 

1964 births
Living people
People from Horlivka
Ukrainian people of Russian descent
Soviet footballers
Ukrainian footballers
Ukraine international footballers
Association football midfielders
Liga Leumit players
FC Shakhtar Donetsk players
Beitar Tel Aviv F.C. players
Maccabi Ironi Ashdod F.C. players
FC Metalurh Donetsk players
Soviet Top League players
Ukrainian Premier League players
Soviet expatriate footballers
Ukrainian expatriate footballers
Expatriate footballers in Israel
Ukrainian football managers
FC Olimpik Donetsk managers
FC Cherkashchyna managers
Pro-Russian people of the 2014 pro-Russian unrest in Ukraine
Pro-Russian people of the war in Donbas
People of the Donetsk People's Republic
Ukrainian collaborators with Russia
Sportspeople from Donetsk Oblast